Plurality criterion is a voting system criterion devised by Douglas R. Woodall for ranked voting methods with incomplete ballots. It is stated as follows:

If the number of ballots ranking A as the first preference is greater than the number of ballots on which another candidate B is given any preference, then A's probability of winning must be no less than B's.

This criterion is trivially satisfied by rank ballot methods which require voters to strictly rank all the candidates (and so do not allow truncation). The Borda count is usually defined in this way.

Woodall has called the Plurality criterion "a rather weak property that surely must hold in any real election" opining that "every reasonable electoral system seems to satisfy it." Most proposed methods do satisfy it, including Plurality voting, IRV, Bucklin voting, and approval voting.

Among Condorcet methods which permit truncation, whether the Plurality criterion is satisfied depends often on the measure of defeat strength. When winning votes is used as the measure of defeat strength in methods such as the Schulze method, Ranked Pairs, or Minimax, Plurality is satisfied. Plurality is failed when margins is used. Minimax using pairwise opposition also fails Plurality.

When truncation is permitted under Borda count, Plurality is satisfied when no points are scored to truncated candidates, and ranked candidates receive no fewer votes than if the truncated candidates had been ranked. If truncated candidates are instead scored the average number of points that would have been awarded to those candidates had they been strictly ranked, or if Nauru's modified Borda count is used, the Plurality criterion is failed.

References
D R Woodall, "Properties of Preferential Election Rules", Voting matters, Issue 3 (1994), pp. 8–15.
D R Woodall, "Monotonicity and Single-Seat Election Rules", Voting matters, Issue 6 (1996), pp. 9–12.

Electoral system criteria